Derick Etwaroo (born 6 January 1964 in Guyana) was a member of the Canadian cricket team from 1986 until 1998. He played for Canada in four ICC Trophy tournaments and in nine list A games, including the cricket tournament at the 1998 Commonwealth Games.

References
Cricket Archive player profile

Canadian cricketers
1964 births
Living people
Cricketers at the 1998 Commonwealth Games
Commonwealth Games competitors for Canada